Ciorbă de perișoare is a Romanian traditional sour soup with meatballs. Perișoare are meatballs usually made with minced pork meat, mixed with rice and spices and boiled in a ciorbă—a soup with vegetables such as onions, parsnips and celery among others and sour liquid or powder and garnished with parsley. It is usually served with sour cream and hot pepper.

See also 
 Chiftele
 List of soups
 Pârjoale
 Hochzeitssuppe
 Sulu köfte
 Smyrna meatballs
 Yuvarlak
 Tabriz meatballs
 Harput meatballs

Notes and references 

Romanian soups